Ramesh Chander Kaushik is an Indian politician and a member of parliament to the 16th Lok Sabha from Sonipat (Lok Sabha constituency), Haryana. He won the 2014 Indian general election being a Bharatiya Janata Party candidate. He was retained as the party candidate for the 2019 17th Lok Sabha elections and defeated his opponent Bhupinder Singh Hooda Ex-CM of Haryana in his home turf of old Rohtak district to retain the seat. Ramesh Kaushik is the single most influential leader of BJP in the Sonipat region who has a clout of friends in RSS, BJP high command and across the party lines. He is very good at making and sustaining relations at all the levels.

Early Political Career 
He started political career from Haryana Vikas Party in the year 1991 when he contested the erstwhile Kailana seat in Sonipat unsuccessfully. Later on in the bansilal wave of 1996 he stood victorious from the same constituency and made was the cabinet minister in the Haryana Government by CM Bansilal. Later on when Bansilal merged the HVP in INC he shifted to Congress. In the 2005 Haryana assembly election he contested from the Delhi bordering Rai constituency and won with a good margin. And was made CPS by the CM BS Hooda. But in the 2009 elections Hooda preferred another Brahmin Kuldeep Sharma over RC Kaushik and the ticket was denied to him.

Established Political Career 
But his stars changed as he was the 1st to grasp the Modi wave in the year 2013 among all other congress leaders like Rao Inderjeet, Ch Birender, Kuldeep Bishnoi and joined the BJP. He was the dark horse in the competition to get the BJP ticket but luck always stood by his side and he was given ticket and he defeated Jagbir Malik of congress in the 2014 parliamentary elections. Again in the year 2019 people were considering him out of race of ticket as he was not CM's favourite in Sonipat constituency but relations, networking and luck worked in his favour and he got the most coveted BJP ticket. 2019 election was a battlefield but Kaushik has always played safe and defeated Bhupendra Singh Hooda by a huge margin of 174000 votes.

Other Position 
He is the member of the parliamentary standing committee on Petroleum and natural gas.

References

India MPs 2014–2019
Living people
People from Sonipat district
Lok Sabha members from Haryana
Bharatiya Janata Party politicians from Haryana
1956 births
India MPs 2019–present
Haryana Vikas Party politicians
Members of the Haryana Legislative Assembly